Isostigena is a monotypic moth genus in the family Lasiocampidae erected by George Thomas Bethune-Baker in 1904. Its single species, Isostigena bicellata, described by the same author in the same year, was found in what is now Papua New Guinea.

References

Lasiocampidae
Monotypic moth genera